The Brigada de Fusileros Paracaidistas (Parachute Riflemen Brigade) , also known as Chutes, is the Mexican Army premier airborne light infantry unit similar to the 75th Ranger Regiment and the British SFSG, the unit act as support for combat operations SEDENA's EMCDN SMUs such as FEBFP or FER.

The brigade is currently headquartered at Santa Lucia Mexican Air Force Base N-1, State of Mexico and is composed of a headquarters company, one special missions unit (operationally under EMCDN command), a logistics company, a airborne training center, and three parachute riflemen battalions.

History

The Brigade's origin dates back to 1946 when Divisional General Francisco L. Urquizo and Director of Aeronautics Divisional General Gustavo Salinas Camiña elaborated a program to create the country's first Paratrooper unit. The plan consisted sending a group of officers and regular servicemen to Fort Benning, Georgia to be trained as paratroopers. By July 20, 1946. The first group under the command of Captain Albarrán López graduated paratrooper school, the second group under the command of Cavalry Lieutenant Jorge Munguía González graduated in the same year on August 3.

The new unit was based in Balbuena Military Camp, carrying out their first jump over Mexican territory on September 15, 1946. The same year the army moved the unit to its new Headquarters in Puebla, Puebla giving them designation of "Compañía Mínima de Aerotropas" ( Minimum Airtrooper Company ). On February 15, 1947. The unit was reorganized into the "Compañía de Aerotropas" ( Airtrooper Company ) and re-established in Military Camp No.1 in the Federal District. By 1969 the Brigada de Fusileros Paracaidistas was created and organized with three battalions, and one special forces group that was integrated in 1998.

Structure

Headquarters Company
1st Infantry Parachute Rifle Battalion (1 BFP)
2nd Infantry Parachute Rifle Battalion (2 BFP)
3rd Infantry Parachute Rifle Battalion (3 BFP)
Special Mission Unit (FEBFP) (Under operational command of SEDENA Estado Mayor Conjunto de la Defensa Nacional, comparable with JSOC Regimental Reconnaissance Company and the UKSF Special Reconnaissance Regiment)
Logistics Company
Airborne Training Center

See also
Grupo Aeromóvil de Fuerzas Especiales
Grupo Aeromóvil de Fuerzas Especiales del Alto Mando
Ixtoc-Alfa
Fuerzas Especiales

References

Military units and formations established in 1969
Airborne brigades
Special forces of Mexico
Mexican Air Force